Dune Acres Clubhouse is a historic clubhouse located at Dune Acres, Porter County, Indiana.  It was built in 1925, and is a three-story, Bungalow / American Craftsman style building.  It has a gable roof and is constructed of reinforced concrete and chinked horizontal logs on the two upper floors.

It was listed on the National Register of Historic Places in 2007.

References

Clubhouses on the National Register of Historic Places in Indiana
Bungalow architecture in Indiana
Buildings and structures completed in 1925
Buildings and structures in Porter County, Indiana
National Register of Historic Places in Porter County, Indiana